Muhammad Zahid b. Hasan al-Kawthari (1879–1952) was the adjunct to the last Shaykh al-Islam of the Ottoman Empire, a Hanafi Maturidi scholar.

Overview
He was born in 1879 in Düzce, now in Turkey (back then in the Ottoman Empire), to family of Circassian descent. After the fall of the Ottoman Empire, the Kemalists began a violent crackdown on the religious scholarly class. Fearing that his life may be in danger, Kawthari fled to Cairo, then to Syria and finally returning to Cairo. There, he edited classical works of Fiqh, Hadith and Usul, bringing them back into circulation. In particular, he wrote short biographies of prominent personalities of the Hanafi school of thought.

Scholarly works
 Tabdid al-Zalam al-Mukhim min Nuniyyat Ibn al-Qayyim - Refutation of Ibn al-Qayyim.
 Bulugh al-Amani fi Sirat al-Imam Muhammad ibn al-Hasan al-Shaybani - a short biography of Imam Abu Hanifa's student who would compile the Zahir al-Riwaya. 
 Al-Fara'id al-Wafiya fi `Ilmay al-`Arud wa al-Qafya - (The Abundant Peerless Matters in the Two Sciences of Prosody and Rhyme).
 Fiqh Ahl al-`Iraq wa Hadithuhum: Originally an introduction to Nasb al-Raya, it was published separately with Shaykh Abdul Fattah's footnotes.
 Hanin al-Mutafajji` wa Anin al-Mutawajji`- a poem on the horrors of World War I.
 Al-Hawi fi Sira al-Imam Abi Ja`far al-Tahawi - a biography of Imam Al-Tahawi.
 Husn al-Taqadi fi Sira al-Imam Abi Yusuf al-Qadi - a biography of Imam Abu Yusuf.
 Al-Istibsar fi al-Tahadduth `an al-Jabr wa al-Ikhtiyar - (The Obtainment of Insight Concerning Determinism and Freedom of Choice).
 Maqalaat ul Kawthari - a collection of his articles.
 Al-Insaf fima Yajib I'tiqaduh (edited by him).
 Tabyin Kadhib al-Muftari fima Nusiba ila al-Imam Abi al-Hasan al-Ash'ari (edited by him).

Creed

A staunch Maturidi, he held a critical view of the Medieval Scholar Ibn Taymiyya and his student Ibn al-Qayyim.

Recent translations of Kawthari's work 
Mufti Muhammad Anwar Khan Qasmi, a Deobandi scholar, has recently translated many of his works into Urdu and published them in Indian academic journals and magazines. For example, al-La Madhhabiyya Qintarat al-La Diniyya, an article Kawthari wrote equating non-conformism to irreligiousness, was translated by Qasmi with extensive footnotes and introduction by him and published by Deoband Islamic Research and Education Trust in 2013 under the title of Ghayr Muqallidiyyat: Ilhad Ka Darwaza. Also, Qasmi translated Kawthari's extensive introduction to Imam Ibn `Asakir's Tabyin Kadhib al-Muftari, published by the same Center in Deoband in 2013, under the title of Islami Firqe: Eik jaiza. Mr. Anwar Qasmi also translated and edited in Urdu one of his great books called Fiqh Ahl al-`Iraq wa Hadīthuhum: Originally an introduction to Naṣb al-Rāyah, which was published separately with Shaykh ʿAbdul Fattāḥ's footnotes. On the same pattern, other books of al-Kawthari like min ʿIbar al-Tārīkh fi al-Kayd lil-Islam, and his introduction to the book al-Asmā wa al-Sifāt of imam Bayhaqī, and al-Kawthari's footnotes on Dhahabi's Bayan Zaghal al-Ilam were also edited and translated my Mr. Qasmi and published from the same Center in Deoband.

See also 
 Mustafa Sabri
 List of Hanafis
 List of Ash'aris and Maturidis
 List of Muslim theologians
 List of Sufis

References

Hanafi fiqh scholars
Hanafis
Maturidis
Mujaddid
20th-century Muslim theologians
Critics of Ibn Taymiyya
Critics of Ibn al-Qayyim
Critics of Wahhabism
Hadith scholars
Sunni Sufis
Sunni imams
Sunni fiqh scholars
Muslims from the Ottoman Empire
Turkish Sunni Muslim scholars of Islam
Turkish legal scholars
Turkish jurists
Turkish Muslims
Turkish translators
Turkish Sufis
Ottoman Sufis
20th-century writers from the Ottoman Empire
People from the Ottoman Empire of Circassian descent
20th-century Muslim scholars of Islam
1879 births
1952 deaths
Supporters of Ibn Arabi